Chiasmocleis ventrimaculata, also known as the dotted humming frog, is a species of frog in the family Microhylidae. It is found in Bolivia, Brazil, Colombia, Ecuador, and Peru.
Its natural habitats are subtropical or tropical moist lowland forests, swamps, and intermittent freshwater marshes.

Description
The Chiasmocleis ventrimaculata is a small nocturnal frog of a snout - vent size of approximately 2 cm. The Chiasmocleis ventrimaculata lack webbing on the hind foot. Furthermore, the Chiasmocleis ventrimaculata has heads that are more narrow and pointed and bodies that are slender as well.

These frogs prefer to remain underground during the day and emerge after dusk alongside of their spider hosts and forage the surrounding areas. These frogs do not appear to be territorial, often several frogs ranging from 1 to 4, can be seen emerging from a tarantula’s burrow.

As tadpoles, they are typically around 17 mm in length and a body length of 7 mm. Their bodies are flattened and are about twice as wide as they are deep. Their widest position is located at the eyes. The eyes are large and widely separated. The snout when viewed from the dorsal position is broad and bluntly rounded and just rounded in the lateral view. The tadpole has no nostrils absent. These tadpoles have small mouths that are terminal. Their upper lips are large, fleshy and cover the oral cavity. They also lack horny mouthparts. These tadpoles are nearly uniform pale brown with additional pigmentation.

These frogs will cautiously exit the burrow at dusk to begin their foraging. The feeding habits of the frogs is that of a modified-sit-and-wait forage mode. This means that they will sit and wait for food to arrive similar to ambush predators. These frogs were observed to stay within a range of 5 cm from the entrance of the burrow and at the end of their foraging period, will rapidly dart back into the burrows.

Habitat and Distribution
The Chiasmocleis ventrimaculata live among leaf litter and other vegetation close to the ground. During mating seasons, they are known to reproduce at temporary ponds of rainwater. Unfortunately, little is currently known about their habits during the dry season.

The Chiasmocleis ventrimaculata’s native geographic distribution is quite disjointed. Most species are found in western Amazon region (Colombia, Ecuador, Peru, Bolivia, and western Brazil).

Conservation Status

Habitat Loss
The Amazon is the center of intense degradation because of human occupancy, deforestation, and mining. As a result, there are large parts of the habitat that are at risk.

Conservation Efforts
The Chiasmocleis ventrimaculata and Chiasmocleis species in general are not listed as threatened by the IUCN and most of the species are listed as Least concern.

Population Structure, Speciation, and Phylogeny

Close Relatives
C. ventrimaculata has several close relatives: Chiasmocleis albopunctata; C. anatipes; C. antenori; C. avilapiresae; C. bassleri; C. carvalhoi; C. devriesi; C. haddadi, sp. nov.; C. hudsoni; C. magnova; C. papachibe, sp. nov.; C. royi, sp. nov.; C. shudikarensis; C. supercilialba; C. tridactyla.

Subspecies
Chiasmocleis jimi is considered a junior synonym of Chiasmocleis hudsoni.

Diet 
The diet of the Chiasmocleis ventrimaculata is mostly ant based. They are also known to feed on mites.

Reproduction and Life Cycle
The eggs are deposited into large temporary ponds which form because of the rainy season. Their clutch size is typically around 400 eggs per clutch. These eggs will hatch 36 hours after fertilization. Immediately after fertilization, the frogs will hatch and remain motionless in a vertical position with their head up under the water. After 24 hours, they shift their position from a vertical to a diagonal of 45 degrees, still remaining motionless. After 48 hours, they begin to move. The froglets will leave the water after 3 weeks. These tadpoles are a nearly uniform pale brown.

These tadpoles can be observed at different depths in shallow water (about 60 cm deep) and they form big, nearly motionless aggregations, in which each individual is positioned in the same direction. The main diet of these tadpoles seems to be detritus from decomposing litter and insects.

Mating
The Chiasmocleis ventrimaculata prefer breeding in temporary ponds in the forest. During the mating season, there is a change in the frog’s behavior. Instead of being nocturnal, these frogs become active both during the day and at night. The males will begin to chorus, or sing, during this period of time as well.

These frogs are explosive breeders. During the rainy season, these frogs are found in groups of hundreds of individuals. After the first substantial rainfall (above 60 mm), males will begin to appear in nearby ponds of water and start to call. These choruses will first begin on land within leaf litter, and later from floating leaves and twigs. The females will reach the ponds by nightfall and these choruses will go on for the next day and night. On the third morning, the frogs will leave the pond which has been filled with clutches of eggs. There is a preliminary calculated sex ratio of 12 males to 1 female. In general, reproductive activities were highest at the beginning of the rainy season and decrease rapidly after November.

Mate Searching Behavior
Males will make calls during the breeding season that consist of a series of short pulses (7-8 per second). The frequency range for these calls falls within 5.120 - 6.960 Hz. These males will move so that their vocal sacs are elevated so that females will be able to hear their calls. 

Mating occurs during most of the day but particularly from 8:00 pm to 4:00 am. The females that are attracted to the males will move into the water towards the males, and the males will then jump into the water to perform amplexus. The males do not vocalize during amplexus, and amplexus will last up to 30 minutes.

Parental Care
The Chiasmocleis ventrimaculata will lay their eggs on the surface of these ponds. Because of the explosive nature of their mating season, thousands of eggs can be deposited in one season onto these ponds. After hatching, these tadpoles will prefer the shores of the waters and tend to aggregate in these positions as a way to defend against aquatic predators.

Social Behavior
The frogs do not appear to care about living in groups and are not territorial. They have been seen living together with multiple frogs within one spider burrow. However, frogs do show high fidelity to the specific burrow which they originally selected and are never seen switching burrows. Even after the tarantulas leave the burrow because of the burrows becoming too inhospitable for the spiders to live in, Chiasmocleis ventrimaculata have been recorded to still live there.

Mutualisms

Commensal Relationship
This frog is primarily known for its mutualistic relationship with the burrowing tarantula Xenesthis immanis. Whether or not the relationship is mutualistic or commensal still dominates conversations surrounding this species. It is clear the dotted humming frog greatly benefits from this relationship, as the tarantula provides the frog protection from predators, a stable food source due to the frog’s ability to feed off the remnants of the spider’s prey, and shelter to protect from climate changes. On the other hand, the frog's foraging protects the tarantula's eggs from ants. The relationship between this specific frog, Chiasmocleis ventrimaculata, and Xenesthis immanis appears to be a special one as these tarantulas attack similar frog species, therefore showing the dotted humming frog must have a special feature attractive to tarantulas. This mutualism between microhylids and large spiders also occurs in other parts of the world.

Tarantulas emerging from their burrows and dotted humming frogs closely follow, and although the tarantula would be expected to attack, they do not. 

It is still debated whether or not the relationship is mutualistic or commensal. Frogs clearly benefit from the association with the spider species: tarantulas protect the frogs from predators yet cause no harm to the spiders, they allow frogs easy access to foraging locations, and even provide them shelter from climate variations, desiccation, and temperature changes. 

It has been hypothesized that the tarantulas might benefit from this relationship due to the fact these frogs are ant specialists, which can help them protect female spider’s eggs from predation, increasing the fitness of female spiders who have these frogs in their burrows. Alternative suggestions include the skin of these frogs containing antimicrobial chemicals which help keep the spider eggs healthy and that because these frogs can attract predators, tarantulas with frogs in their burrows have access to more food because these predators are attracted to the frogs and the tarantulas will eat these predators. Furthermore, there is contention on the species of spider that these frogs coexist with. Originally thought to be Xenethis immanis, further research has found that this species of spider would not be found in the regions of Peru where the original research was conducted. Instead, new research suggests that the tarantula is some species of Pamphobeteus.

The tarantulas have been recorded attacking similar frog species to Chiasmocleis ventrimaculata, but have been never recorded attacking Chiasmocleis ventrimaculata by mistake. The movements of Chiasmocleis ventrimaculata do not stimulate the host tarantulas to attack and there is an unknown chemical present in the frog’s skin that acts as a cue to the tarantulas that the species of frog is not prey. These spiders did attempt to catch and eat 5 species of anurans from the families Bufonidae, Hylidae, and Leptodactylidae. It is noted that the frogs will remain more active in areas with some vegetation while the spiders used the open area.

Enemies

Predators 
As tadpoles, Chiasmocleis ventrimaculata are often preyed upon by freshwater crustacean species such as Dilocarcinus and Goyazana. They have also been seen being eaten by Odonata larvae. In addition, turtle species such as Phrynops gibbus and Podocnemis unifilis are also known to feed on tadpoles. Spider species are known to prey on adult frogs and fish like Hoplias malabaricus, Synbranchus marmoratus also feed on frogs and tadpoles alike. Caimans have also been seen preying on these frogs. There are a wide variety of bird species, Capped Herons, Sunbitterns, Double-toothed Kites have also been seen feeding on frogs and their young as well, although snake species appear to be the main predator of these frogs. Even certain species of bats, suspected to be Trachops cirrhosus, have been seen trying to feed on frogs during mass mating calls.

Protective Coloration and Behavior 
Chiasmocleis ventrimaculata have cryptic camouflage which allows them to resemble fallen leaves. In addition, when threatened these frogs will make a short leap and land with their legs stretched backwards in a stiff-legged posture. This behavior has been seen to last up to 4 minutes.

References

External links

ventrimaculata
Frogs of South America
Amphibians of Bolivia
Amphibians of Brazil
Amphibians of Colombia
Amphibians of Peru
Amphibians described in 1945
Taxa named by Lars Gabriel Andersson
Taxonomy articles created by Polbot